Bernhard Ørn Palsson is the Galletti Professor of Bioengineering and an adjunct professor of Medicine at the University of California, San Diego.

Education
Palsson received his PhD from the University of Wisconsin–Madison in 1984 under the supervision of Edwin N. Lightfoot.

Research
Upon graduation Palsson joined the chemical engineering faculty at University of Michigan where he served as a professor until 1995. In 1995, he joined the department of Bioengineering at University of California, San Diego and was named the Galetti Chair of Bioengineering in 2004. In 2005 he became a faculty member of Keio University.

Palsson has authored or co-authored over 300 peer-reviewed scientific articles and is the holder of over 35 patents. His research interests include metabolic network modelling, systems biology, tissue engineering and cell culture, the development of analysis procedures for genome-scale models, and  the experimental verification of these models in Escherichia coli, Saccharomyces cerevisiae  and other important organisms.
 
Palsson serves on the editorial board of several scientific journals including Annals of Biomedical Engineering, Biotechnology and Bioengineering, Metabolic Engineering and Molecular Systems Biology. He was elected a member of the National Academy of Engineering in 2006 for scholarship, technological advances, and entrepreneurial activities in metabolic engineering. He is also a fellow of the American Association for the Advancement of Science in 2011.

References

Members of the United States National Academy of Engineering
University of Michigan faculty
University of California, San Diego faculty
Academic staff of Keio University
American bioinformaticians
Living people
Systems biologists
1957 births
University of Wisconsin–Madison College of Engineering alumni
Network scientists